Window of Time is a children's book by Karen Weinberg and illustrated by Annelle Woggon Ratcliffe. It was published in 1991 by White Maine Publishing Company. Targeted to 8 to 12 year olds, the story follows a Westminster, Maryland-based boy living in 1988 who accidentally time traveled to the Battle of Gettysburg. The cover was designed by Harry A. West.

References 

1991 children's books
Novels set during the American Civil War
American children's novels
1991 American novels